Lac du Bois ("Lake of the Woods" in French) is a French language and culture camp at the Concordia Language Villages based in Minnesota. As with the other Concordia Language Village programs, it is a language immersion program. The Lac du Bois experience is offered on two sites: one in Bemidji, MN and another in Hackensack, MN. A third site, Voyageurs (camp), provides similar language learning with a different curriculum and structure. All Concordia Language Villages programs are accredited by the American Camp Association.

General program content 

As with all Concordia Language Villages, the Lac du Bois mission is “to prepare young people for responsible citizenship in our global community”. It is also structured around the values and practices of the CLVway, or the four precepts representing key attributes of responsible global citizenship:
 Grand Simulation - Lac du Bois simulates a multicultural “village” where French is the main language of all activities and where participants (called “villagers”) practice cultural sensitivity and empathy in the everyday experiences of Language Village life. At the beginning of the program, villagers go through a simulated customs process and choose Francophone names, which are used during their stay.
 Community-based Learning - In addition to language immersion, villagers are immersed in the camp community and friendships that form in a collaborative space.
 Lived Language and Culture - Villagers participate in hands-on activities, skits, songs, and games throughout the day that draw from various cultures. Learning (expanding on language skills and cultural understandings) occurs naturally in a fun atmosphere.
 Outdoor Learning - Villagers at the Language Villages spend time in the fresh air! Everyday practices aim to minimize the impact on the natural environment they inhabit. With the 2020 merge of the Hackensack and Bemidji programs, special emphasis is put on environmental science activities, as was the focus of Lac du Bois Hackensack's "Colo Éco" curriculum.
The program emphasizes French culture in France and throughout the Francophone world. Countries explored include Belgium, Switzerland, Canada (Quebec), sub-Saharan Africa (ex. Cameroon, Mali, Ivory Coast, Senegal), Northern Africa (Maghreb), the United States (Louisiana and Maine), Vietnam, the Caribbean, and French Polynesia. Village programs include music, games, traditions, films, clothes, and food from all regions. A villager might listen to rai music from North Africa, eat boeuf bourgignon, play in a "world cup" soccer game, learn to play an African drum djembe, make fondue, and participate in a Mardi Gras celebration, all in French. Each day has a theme (based on a culture or global issue); activities and cuisine are aligned with the day's theme so that villagers can delve in depth into an area of the world or a question each day.

Lac du Bois is a total immersion program, and (with exceptions for emergencies) counselors and staff communicate exclusively in French. Lac du Bois is appropriate for villagers of all language proficiency levels. Beginners find that the French spoken is easy to understand thanks in part to the use of gestures, skits, and modeling. Fluent speakers engage with more complex topics (global issues, cultures, the environment, etc.), which offer a chance to practice rare vocabulary and higher-level conversations. Villagers are in mixed-level groups for much of the day and are in level-specific groups for 2–3 hours per day.

Lac du Bois values other areas of learning such as practicing new ways of thinking, leadership, adaptability, collaboration, empathy, creativity, etc.

Staff

Lac du Bois staff come from all over the United States and the French-speaking world. Business and meetings within the village are conducted exclusively in French. Since all staff members are successful second language learners themselves, whether they are native French or English speakers, they are able to provide an empathetic, patient, supportive and challenging environment for villagers learning their first foreign language.

Program types

Youth, Family and Adult Sessions 
Elementary-aged kids can attend a one- or a two-week session.

Middle schoolers can attend a one-, two-, or four-week session. (not for academic credit).

High schoolers can attend for one, two, or four weeks.

Four-week high school aged credit villagers can earn either the equivalent of one year of high school French or one class of college credit. These intensive courses are somewhat non-traditional since they are conducted in a camp environment and the time is highly condensed.  This program is offered as a residential program at both Lac du Bois locations, and as a hybrid Minnesota/Europe program (which spends two weeks at Lac du Bois Hackensack and two weeks in France and Belgium). Credit is given by Concordia College, which sponsors the Concordia Language Village program.

Families (any combination of adults and kids representing a family) can attend family camp sessions that include pre-school and adult classes. One-week family sessions take place in the summer, and weekend sessions are offered during the academic year.

Adults can attend one-week sessions offered during the academic year.

Many of these programs run alongside each other during the summer. Villagers in youth sessions are housed with other villagers of their age and gender. Families are housed together in private or semi-private cabins (shared cabin with curtained sections for each family) depending on the site.

School Groups ("Village Weekends")
Discontinued in 2020, village weekends were hosted at Skogfjorden's permanent site outside Bemidji, Minnesota, the French Language Village offered short term programs for school groups and teachers. This program (which used to be called mini-programs or mini-weekends) welcomed eager learners of French for exploratory weekends throughout the academic year since the early 1970s.  Each year a new theme was explored in-depth through music, art, meals, skits and of course French.  Themes included l'Acadie, le Maroc, le Sud de la France, le Moyen Age, la Revolution Francaise, l'Afrique and les Caraibes.  Village Weekends hosted school groups from across the country who were interested in short-term experiences in French language and Francophone culture within the United States.

Locations

Permanent site 
The permanent Lac du Bois site is located on Turtle River Lake with several other Language Villages (Skogfjorden, Salolampi, El Lago del Bosque, Lesnoe Ozero, Waldsee) near Bemidji, Minnesota. The site is designed to be as authentically French as possible, with French style architecture, including three sets of cabins named Corse, Bretagne and Provence and with details that reflect the appropriate region of France. The cabins themselves are named after major cities within those provinces. The main building is called Paris. There is also a regulation pétanque or boules court, and a small store that sells authentic European candy and treats.

A notable addition to the Bemidji site is a traditional African Round House, called a "Boukarou".
This is a Concordia Language Village Evergreen Award presented to Karen "Nicole" Anderson, a longtime Dean of Lac du Bois, for 25 years of service to the organization.

Camp Holiday 
Located near Hackensack, Minnesota, Camp Holiday is the oldest site still being leased by Concordia Language Villages.  The Camp Holiday site was originally a camp for girls built in the 1920s and many of its buildings still date from that era.  The pristine lakes and traditional camp feel of Lac du Bois, Hackensack (as the program was sometimes called) offered a home to many villagers and staff summer after summer. Lac du Bois Hackensack is the longest-running French site of Concordia, also hosting the Italian Language Village  "Lago del Bosco" during the summer.

The geography of Camp Holiday includes two hills and is located between Mann and Baby Lakes with part of the main road separating the two by just a few yards. Of all the Concordia sites, it has the most waterfront.

In 2019, the decision was made to reduce programming at Hackensack and to merge with the Bemidji Lac du Bois program, reflecting the reduced student enrollment in French across the country. The Hackensack program was known for its emphasis on Francophone cultures, particularly those of West Africa as well as an emphasis on nature.

The Lac du Bois Hackensack website can be found here.

See also
 Concordia Language Villages

References

External links
 Concordia Language Villages French programs page

Concordia Language Villages
Language camps
French-language education
Bemidji, Minnesota